Soleymanabad, Tehran may refer to:

 Salmian, in Malard County
 Salmanabad, Fashapuyeh, in Rey County